Amy Porter may refer to:

 Amy Porter (flutist), American flutist and pedagogue
 Amy Porter (Waterloo Road), a character in the TV series Waterloo Road